The Girl Most Likely is Claudja Barry's second studio album, released in 1977. In the US, the album was released under the title Claudja.

Track listings
"Take Me in Your Arms...."	4:23	
"Take It Easy"	6:53	
"Love Machine"	3:48	
"When Life Was Just a Game"	3:34	
"Every Beat of My Heart"	2:31	
"Open the Door"	3:33	
"Johnny Johnny Please Come Home"	2:55	
"Sexy Talkin' Lover"	4:02	
"Dancin' Fever"	6:04	
"Long Lost Friend"	4:17

References

External links
 Claudja Barry-The Girl Most Likely at Discogs

1977 albums
Claudja Barry albums
Philips Records albums